The Tabernacle Choir at Temple Square, formerly known as the Mormon Tabernacle Choir, is an American choir, acting as part of the Church of Jesus Christ of Latter-day Saints (LDS Church). It has performed in the Salt Lake Tabernacle for over 100 years. The Tabernacle houses an organ, consisting of 11,623 pipes, which usually accompanies the choir.

The choir was founded on August 22, 1847, twenty-nine days after the Mormon pioneers entered the Salt Lake Valley. Prospective singers must be LDS Church members who are eligible for a temple recommend, between 25 and 55 years of age at the start of choir service, and live within  of Temple Square.

The choir is one of the most famous in the world. It first performed for a U.S. President in 1911, and has performed at the inaugurations of presidents Lyndon B. Johnson (1965), Richard Nixon (1969), Ronald Reagan (1981), George H. W. Bush (1989), George W. Bush (2001), and Donald Trump (2017). The choir's weekly devotional program, Music & the Spoken Word, is one of the longest-running radio programs in the world, and has aired every week since July 15, 1929.

History

The Tabernacle was completed in October 1867 and the choir held its first concert there on July 4, 1873.

The choir started out fairly small and rather undisciplined. On April 6, 1869, George Careless was appointed as the choir's conductor and the Tabernacle Choir began to improve musically. Under Careless, the first large choir was assembled by adding smaller choral groups to the main Salt Lake Choir. This larger choir, just over 300, sang at the church's October 6-8, 1873 general conference. It was at this point that the choir began to match the size of the spacious Tabernacle. On September 1, 1910, the choir sang the song "Let the Mountains shout for Joy" as their first ever recording. Three hundred of the 600 members showed up for the recording.

Since July 15, 1929, the choir has performed a weekly radio broadcast, Music & the Spoken Word, which is one of the longer-running continuous radio network broadcasts in the world.

Later directors brought more solid vocal training and worked to raise the standards of the choir. The choir also began improving as an ensemble and increased its repertoire from around one hundred songs to nearly a thousand. On July 15, 1929, the choir performed its first radio broadcast of Music & the Spoken Word. By 1950, the Tabernacle Choir at Temple Square performed numerous concerts each year and had released its first long-playing recording. During the 1950s, the choir made its first tour of Europe and earned a Grammy Award for its recording of the "Battle Hymn of the Republic". 

At the end of the choir's 4,165th live broadcast on July 12, 2009, the show's host, Lloyd D. Newell, announced another milestone that the show had hit: the completion of its 80th year in existence. The show has been televised since the early 1960s and is now broadcast worldwide through approximately 1,500 radio and television stations.

On October 5, 2018, the choir retired the name "The Mormon Tabernacle Choir" and adopted the name "The Tabernacle Choir at Temple Square" in order to align with the direction of LDS Church leadership regarding the use of terms "Mormon" and "LDS" in referencing church members. The new name retains the reference to the historic Salt Lake Tabernacle, which has been the choir's home for over 150 years, and its location on Temple Square in Salt Lake City, Utah.

Several award-winning popular artists have reflected on the beauty of the choir's music publicly including Bryn Terfel, Gladys Knight (of Gladys Knight and the Pips), Sting (of The Police), James Taylor, Ric Ocasek (of The Cars), and The Osmonds.

Milestones

Since its establishment, The Tabernacle Choir at Temple Square has performed and recorded extensively, both in the United States (where U.S. President Ronald Reagan called it "America's Choir") and around the world. The following are some of its key points:
 Visited 28 countries outside the United States.
 Performed at 13 World's Fairs and Expositions.
 Released more than 130 musical compilations and several films and videotapes.
 Reached more than 100 million YouTube views on its channel (in October 2017).
 "Come, Thou Fount of Every Blessing" became the choir's first video to surpass 10 million YouTube views (in July 2020).

The Tabernacle Choir at Temple Square has performed for ten presidents of the United States beginning with William Howard Taft. The choir has also performed at the inaugurations of United States presidents Lyndon B. Johnson (1965), Richard M. Nixon (1969), Ronald Reagan (1981), George H. W. Bush (1989), George W. Bush (2001), and Donald Trump (2017).

Other notable events the choir has performed at include the following:
 Performed over 20 times at the 2002 Winter Olympics in Salt Lake City, including at the Opening Ceremony, where they sang the national anthem and the Olympic Hymn under the direction of John Williams.
 The American Bicentennial in Washington, D.C. (July 4, 1976)
 The Constitution's bicentennial celebration at Independence Hall in Philadelphia, Pennsylvania (1987)
It has also participated in several significant events, including:
 National broadcasts honoring the passing of U.S. Presidents:
 Franklin D. Roosevelt (April 12, 1945)
 John F. Kennedy (November 24, 1963)

Tours
From its first national tour in 1893, under the direction of Evan Stephens, to the Chicago World's Fair, the choir has performed in locations around the world, including:
 Los Angeles (1926) Hollywood Bowl.
 Chicago (1934) Century of Progress Exposition.
 San Diego (1935) California Pacific International Exposition.
 Western Europe (August 19 – September 17, 1955) Glasgow, Manchester, Cardiff, Prince Albert Hall in London, Amsterdam, Scheveningen, Copenhagen, West Berlin, Wiesbaden, Bern, Palais de Chaillot in Paris. Also sang at the dedication of the Bern Switzerland Temple on 11 September 1955 on this tour.
 Central America (1968, 1972)
 Western Europe (1973, 1998)
 Western Europe (June 5–21, 1982) Bergen International Festival in Bergen, Oslo, Stockholm, Helsinki, Copenhagen, Aalborg, Rotterdam, Royal Albert Hall in London.
 Central Europe and the former Soviet Union (June 8–29, 1991) Frankfurt, Strasbourg, Zürich, Vienna, Budapest, Prague, Dresden, Berlin, Warsaw, Moscow, Leningrad.
 Israel (December 26, 1992 – January 6, 1993) Haifa, Jerusalem, Tel Aviv.
 Japan/Korea (September 8–13, 1979) Festival Hall in Osaka, Kaikan Hall in Kyoto, Fumon-kan Hall in Tokyo, Seoul National Theater in Seoul.
 Japan/Korea (1982) 
 Brazil (May 24–30, 1981) "Week of Music of the Americas" and Ibirapuera Auditorium in São Paulo.
 South Pacific (June 14 – July 5, 1988) Laie, Honolulu, Auckland, Christchurch, Wellington, Adelaide, Brisbane, Melbourne, Perth, Sydney.
 Eastern United States (2003) Interlochen, Wolftrap, Saratoga, Lincoln Center, Tanglewood.
 Canada and Eastern United States (June 20–27, 2011) Chautauqua, New York City, Norfolk, Philadelphia, Toronto, Washington, D.C.
 Western United States (2012)
 Midwest United States (June 12–20, 2013) Chicago, Columbus, Indianapolis, Madison, Milwaukee, Minneapolis.
 Eastern United States (June 24 – July 7, 2015) Bethel Woods, Bethesda, Boston, New York City, Saratoga Springs.
 Western Europe (June 27 – July 16, 2016) Brussels, Berlin, Frankfurt, Nuremberg, Rotterdam, Vienna, Zürich.
U.S. West Coast (June 19 – July 2, 2018) Costa Meta, Los Angeles, Berkeley, Mountain View, Rohnert Park, Vancouver, Seattle.

Christmas concerts

The choir performs an annual Christmas concert in the Conference Center in Salt Lake City during the month of December. Typically, the concert consists of three performances: a Thursday dress rehearsal, followed by Friday and Saturday concerts. The combined audience for each concert series is approximately 63,000. Tickets to the concert are free, and are available on a first-come, first-served basis.  A live album (CD/DVD) is typically released, along with the concert being aired on PBS and BYUtv, during December of the following year.

Guest artists participate and sing with the choir most years. A guest narrator is also invited most years to read the Christmas story from the Book of Luke. Past guest artists have included:
 2000: R&B singer Gladys Knight and actress Roma Downey
 2001: Actress Angela Lansbury
 2002: News anchor Walter Cronkite
 2003: Mezzo-soprano Frederica von Stade and baritone Bryn Terfel
 2004: Broadway actress Audra McDonald and actor Peter Graves
 2005: Soprano Renée Fleming and actress Claire Bloom
 2006: Soprano Sissel Kyrkjebø
 2007: A cappella group the King's Singers
 2008: Broadway singer Brian Stokes Mitchell and actor Edward Herrmann
 2009: Jazz singer Natalie Cole and historian David McCullough
 2010: Pop singer David Archuleta and actor Michael York
 2011: Operatic baritone Nathan Gunn and actress Jane Seymour
 2012: Tenor Alfie Boe and news anchor Tom Brokaw  The event also featured Col. Gail "Hal" Halvorsen.
 2013: Soprano Deborah Voigt and actor John Rhys-Davies
 2014: Broadway actor Santino Fontana and The Sesame Street Muppets
 2015: Broadway actress Laura Osnes, actor Martin Jarvis, and four Metropolitan Opera soloists.
 2016: Tenor Rolando Villazón
 2017: Actress Sutton Foster and actor Hugh Bonneville
 2018: Actress and coloratura soprano Kristin Chenoweth
 2019: Broadway actress Kelli O'Hara and actor Richard Thomas
 2020: No concert (owing to COVID-19 pandemic)
 2021: Broadway actress and soprano Megan Hilty and actor Neal McDonough
 2022: Broadway actress Lea Salonga and actor Sir David Suchet

Pioneer Day concerts
The choir holds a yearly summer concert in mid-late July as part of Utah's Pioneer Day celebrations. Unlike the Christmas concerts, there are only two shows: one on Friday and the other on the following Saturday. The tickets are available on a first-come, first-served basis. A guest artist is typically invited every year. Past guest artists have included:

 2011: Brian Stokes Mitchell and Linda Eder
 2012: Katherine Jenkins
 2013: Nathan Pacheco and Lindsey Stirling
 2014: Santino Fontana and Sylvia McNair
 2015: Laura Osnes
 2016: King's Singers
 2017: Alex Boyé
 2018: Matthew Morrison and Laura Michelle Kelly
 2019: Sissel Kyrkjebø<ref>{{Cite web|url=https://www.deseretnews.com/article/900071090/sissel-the-voice-of-titanic-will-perform-with-the-tabernacle-choir-at-temple-square-this-pioneer-day.html|title = Sissel, 'the Voice of 'Titanic, will perform with the Tabernacle Choir at Temple Square this Pioneer Day|website = Deseret News|date = 16 May 2019}}</ref>
 2020: No concert (owing to COVID-19 pandemic)
 2021: No concert (owing to COVID-19 pandemic)
 2022: Shea Owens

Leadership
The Tabernacle Choir at Temple Square has about 15 staff members including a president, directors, organists, a Music and the Spoken Word announcer, and two business-related staff members.

Music directors

Mack Wilberg is the current director, with associate director Ryan Murphy.

Organists

Richard Elliott, Andrew Unsworth, Linda Margetts, Brian Mathias, and Joseph Peeples are the current organists.

Music and the Spoken Word announcers

Since its inception in 1929, the "spoken word" segment of the program has been voiced by four separate individuals. The original writer, producer, and announcer of the spoken portion of the broadcast was Edward (Ted) Kimball, who would stand at the top of a tall ladder and announce the name of each performance piece into the microphone suspended from the Tabernacle ceiling. Kimball remained at the post for only 11 months, when he was replaced by Richard L. Evans, who continued in that capacity until his death in 1971. J. Spencer Kinard took over as announcer in 1972 until he stepped down in 1990. Lloyd D. Newell has been the announcer since then.

Awards and inductions
The choir has a number of awards, including the National Medal of Arts (2003), a Grammy Award for Best Performance by a Vocal Group or Chorus (1960), and four Emmy Awards (1987, 2013, 2014).  The choir is also an inductee to the American Classical Music Hall of Fame (2015) and the National Association of Broadcasters Broadcasting Hall of Fame (2004). The 320-person choir is the largest act to chart on the Billboard Hot 100—their version of "The Battle Hymn of the Republic" reached No. 13 in 1959.

Other awards
1944
 Peabody Award — Music and the Spoken Word for Outstanding Entertainment in Music

1961
 Peabody Award — Music and the Spoken Word — "Let Freedom Ring"

1981
 Freedoms Foundation's George Washington Award — Music and the Spoken Word — Fourth of July Broadcast

1988
 Freedoms Foundation's George Washington Award

2003
 International Radio and Television Society Foundation's Special Recognition Award
 Chorus America's Margaret Hillis Award for Choral Excellence

2004
 Library of Congress' National Recording Registry — Handel's Messiah (1959)

2006
 Mother Teresa Award

2010
 National Radio Hall of Fame — Music and the Spoken WordRecordings

Since its first recording in 1910, the choir has earned five gold albums (two in 1963: The Lord's Prayer and Handel's Messiah; one in 1979: The Joy of Christmas; and two in 1985: The Mormon Tabernacle Choir Sings Christmas Carols and Joy to the World) and two platinum albums (in 1991, Hallmark Christmas: Carols of Christmas and in 1992, Hallmark Christmas: Celebrate Christmas!). The choir has made over 200 recordings and continues to produce albums. For some live performances and albums, the choir has collaborated with large orchestras such as the New York Philharmonic, the Philadelphia Orchestra, the Royal Philharmonic Orchestra of London, the Boston Pops Orchestra, and the Orchestra at Temple Square.  The choir's own record label was formed in 2003.

Chart-topping albums

Filmography
 This Is Cinerama (1952)
 Mr. Krueger's Christmas (1980), starring James Stewart
 Nora's Christmas Gift (1989)
 Singing with Angels (2016)

References

Further reading
 

External links

 Tabernacle Choir Official site
 "Mormons on a Mission" article by Kirk Johnson, New York Times''

1847 establishments in Utah
American choirs
Columbia Records artists
Latter Day Saint musical groups
Musical groups established in 1847
Musical groups from Salt Lake City
Musical groups from Utah
Performing arts in Utah
 
Temple Square
United States National Medal of Arts recipients